Blue Bell Hill is a small neighborhood in Philadelphia, Pennsylvania, United States. The neighborhood is home to multiple historic buildings including RittenhouseTown Historic District and Thomas Mansion. Blue Bell Park is located in this neighborhood.

See also
 List of Philadelphia neighborhoods

References

Neighborhoods in Philadelphia